Daniel Cartier (born June 25, 1969) is an American songwriter, singer and actor.

Background
Daniel Cartier is a musician and visual artist residing in Tennessee. Through multiple forms of creative expression, he is a communicator who redefines the meaning of hard work.

Cartier grew up in Exeter, New Hampshire, where he played in goth and punk bands as a teenager. In 1991, he moved to New York City, where he began as a performer in subway stations before playing in nightclubs. He produced two albums on his own label, one of which (The Subway Session) was in fact recorded in the subway station. Finally, he signed a contract with Elton John's music label Rocket Records, for whom he recorded the album Avenue A in 1997.

After being dropped by Rocket in 1998 following a corporate takeover, Cartier briefly moved to Los Angeles. There, the Daniel Cartier band performed sold out shows on the Sunset Strip at the Viper Room for a series of monthly residencies supporting John Doe of the seminal LA punk band X.

He then suffered a nervous breakdown, and left the music business for a time before reemerging in 2004 with the independent albums Revival and Wide Outside. The albums were recorded at his new home recording studio in the Cape Cod area of Massachusetts.

September 2015 he released his back catalog digitally - alongside a new fifteen song album "Exeter", named after his hometown. The album was recorded in his childhood home after his parents passed away.

In 2005 he appeared as main character in the experimental and controversial film Flirting with Anthony, directed by Christian Calson.

Daniel's returning to music on a full-time basis in 2023, with the upcoming release of his album "Mix Tape Summer"; a collection of songs inspired by summer jams and dance floors. 

In 2021, Daniel's music was featured in the critically acclaimed film "Swan Song", starring the legendary actor Udo Kier, Linda Evans, and Jennifer Collidge. Along with his vocals, which were mixed into the films score - his song "Hovering" is played over the closing credits.

He also began work on a clothing line inspired by his visual artwork. New items are being added regularly to his online store.

History 
Daniel got his start in New York City, singing on subway platforms and street corners in the dead of winter. Discovered by Elton John - quite literally while singing for his supper - Daniel was signed to Elton’s label Rocket Records. Daniel’s first disc, “Live From New York: The Subway Sessions” was recorded live on a New York City subway platform, and proceeds were donated to various homeless organizations.  Says Daniel, “Many people who fall through the cracks of our society have no other place to rest their heads except the subway. Seeing as I was recording an album in their home - I felt it was important to give something back.” 

Daniel was then paired with legendary producer Fred Maher (10,000 Maniacs, Matthew Sweet, Lou Reed) to record his major label studio debut for Elton’s record label. The resulting album, “Avenue A”, was a critical smash, receiving 5-star reviews in various publications and landing on many “best of” lists at the year’s end. 

Daniel toured throughout America and Europe and made several appearances on national television (MTV, VH1, NY1 News, FX,CNN) radio in cities throughout the U.S, appeared in numerous magazines (Entertainment Weekly, Billboard, Interview, HITS, PAPER, Vogue, Spin, New York Times, Boston Globe)

Writers have compared him to artists as diverse as Al Green, Cat Stevens, Donovan, Sonic Youth, the late Jeff Buckley, and "a kinder, gentler Prince." He has also been called "the James Taylor of the Lollapalooza Generation." 

As an openly gay artist, Daniel has never shied away from speaking out on subjects of equality and justice. At the Twenty Fifth Anniversary of The Stonewall rebellion that marked a turning point in the LGBT fight for acceptance, Daniel received a standing ovation from an estimated half a million people after performing his song, "Pushing Back Life."

Not wanting to be limited to recording only when a record label footed the bill, Daniel educated himself on the art of sound engineering and music production: recording CDs for himself and others in the process. His organic approach to songwriting and prolific ability has resulted in a catalog of over 800 songs spanning many different musical styles. When not recording, Daniel spends his time creating gigantic works of art, which have been shown in galleries throughout America. He also began his acting career with a bang, landing roles in many films.

His most recent album, “Redemption”, produced by TONY® AWARD winning producer Joe McGinnis (Spring Awakening, Best Musical) and Derek Garten (Parachute Musical, Jewel, Band Of Horses) brings Daniel’s voice front and center. Symphonic elements — strings, horns, and woodwinds — weave through a landscape of thundering guitars, drums and electronic machinery. It’s classic vintage rock meets Modern Rock with a dash of Rufus Wainright drama - and features brilliant playing by members of Lynyrd Skynyrd, P-funk All Stars, The Wallflowers, Sheryl Crow’s backup band and The Nashville Symphony. From soaring cathedral sounds to down-and-dirty grit, Redemption provides a musical journey that speaks to the soul of every human trying to stay calm in a sometimes-crazy world.

Daniel has hosted countless fundraisers for animal shelters and donates his time and talent to both human- and animal-related charities. He’s been privileged to work with - and learn from - many accomplished people, among them Daryl Hall and Sir Elton himself. This résumé combined with innate talent makes Daniel’s music inspiring and unique.

Discography 
The Troubadour of Avenue A (1993)
Live from New York: The Subway Session (1996)	
Avenue A (1997)	
Glorified Demos (1999)	
Revival (2004)	
Wide Outside (2001)
You and Me are We (2006)
This Christmas (2009)
Redemption (2010)
Exeter (2015)
Naked Christmas (With Jason Slayton) (2022)

References

External links 
Daniel Cartier

1969 births
Living people
American male singer-songwriters
Singer-songwriters from New Hampshire
American male film actors
20th-century American singers
21st-century American singers
American gay musicians
American gay actors
LGBT people from New Hampshire
20th-century American male singers
21st-century American male singers
20th-century American LGBT people
21st-century American LGBT people